Donald Delbert Clayton (born March 18, 1935) is an American astrophysicist whose most visible achievement was the prediction from nucleosynthesis theory that supernovae are intensely radioactive. That earned Clayton the NASA Exceptional Scientific Achievement Medal (1992) for “theoretical astrophysics related to the formation of (chemical) elements in the explosions of stars and to the observable products of these explosions”. Supernovae thereafter became the most important stellar events in astronomy owing to their profoundly radioactive nature. Not only did Clayton discover radioactive nucleosynthesis during explosive silicon burning in stars  but he also predicted a new type of astronomy based on it, namely the associated gamma-ray line radiation emitted by matter ejected from supernovae. That paper was selected as one of the fifty most influential papers in astronomy during the twentieth century for the Centennial Volume of the American Astronomical Society. He gathered support from influential astronomers and physicists for a new NASA budget item for a gamma-ray-observatory satellite, achieving successful funding for Compton Gamma Ray Observatory. With his focus on radioactive supernova gas Clayton discovered a new chemical pathway causing carbon dust to condense there by a process that is activated by the radioactivity.

Clayton's foundational ideas for five original subfields of astrophysics are detailed in Section 5 below. They are: (1) nucleosynthesis, the assembly within stars of the atomic nuclei of the common chemical elements by nuclear reactions occurring therein; (2) astronomical detection of gamma-ray lines emitted by radioactive atoms created and ejected by supernovae; (3) mathematical models of the growth over time of the interstellar abundances of radioactive atoms; (4) predictions of the existence of interstellar cosmic dust grains from individual stars—individual chunks of long-dead stars. He named those stardust, each containing isotopically identifiable radioactive atoms of the host stars; (5) predictions of the condensation of solid grains of pure carbon within hot, oxygen-dominated radioactive supernova gases. Clayton launched these original ideas from research positions at California Institute of Technology, Rice University, Cambridge University (England), Max-Plank Institute for Nuclear Physics (Germany), Durham University (England) and Clemson University during an international academic career spanning six decades.

Clayton also authored four books for the public: (1) a novel, The Joshua Factor (1985), is a parable of the origin of mankind utilizing the mystery of solar neutrinos; (2) a science autobiography, Catch a Falling Star; (3) a mid-career memoir The Dark Night Sky, of cultural interest owing to Clayton's conception of it in 1970 as layout for a movie with Italian filmmaker Roberto Rossellini about growing awareness during a cosmological life (See Personal below); (4)Handbook of Isotopes in the Cosmos (Cambridge Univ. Press, 2003), describing in prose the nuclear origin of each isotope of our natural elements and important evidence supporting each nuclear origin. Clayton has also published on the web (5) Photo Archive for the History of Nuclear Astrophysics from his personal photographs and his researched captions recording photographic history during his research in nuclear astrophysics, a contribution to the history of science.

National honors
Fellow, American Academy of Arts and Sciences
NASA Exceptional Scientific Achievement Medal (1992)
Leonard Medal of the Meteoritical Society (1991)
NASA Public Service Group Achievement Award for the Oriented Scintillation Spectrometer Team on NASA's Compton Gamma Ray Observatory (1992)
Jesse Beams Medal of the American Physical Society (1998)
South Carolina Governor's Award for Excellence in Science (1994)
Alexander von Humboldt Award (1977 and 1982) sponsored by Max Planck Institut für Kernphysik, Heidelberg
Author of one of the 50 most influential research papers of the 20th century selected by American Astronomical Society and author in the AAS Centennial Volume

Clayton was elected to Phi Beta Kappa during his third year as a student at Southern Methodist University. He was awarded many supporting fellowships: National Science Foundation Predoctoral Fellow (1956–58); Alfred P. Sloan Foundation Fellow (1966–68); Fulbright Fellow (1979–80); Fellow of St. Mary's College, Durham University (1987); SERC Senior Visiting Fellow, The Open University, Milton Keynes, U.K. (1993). In 1993 Clayton was named Distinguished Alumnus of Southern Methodist University, thirty-seven years after his BS degree there.

Early life and education
Clayton was born on March 18, 1935, in a modest rented duplex on Walnut Street in Shenandoah, Iowa, while his parents were temporarily away from both family farms near Fontanelle seeking work during the Great Depression. Clayton spent much of his early childhood on those farms and has rhapsodized over his love of the farm. Clayton attended public school in Texas after his father's new job as co-pilot for Braniff Airlines moved the family to Dallas in 1939. His parents purchased a home in the already renowned Highland Park school system, providing him excellent education. He graduated third in his 1953 class of 92 students from Highland Park High School. Becoming the first among his entire Iowa relations to seek post-high-school education, Clayton matriculated at Southern Methodist University and excelled in physics and mathematics, graduating summa cum laude in 1956.

At the urging of his SMU professors, he applied as a physics research student to California Institute of Technology (Caltech), which he attended bearing a National Science Foundation Predoctoral Fellowship. In the 1957 nuclear physics course at Caltech Clayton learned from William Alfred Fowler about a new theory that the chemical elements had been assembled within the stars by nuclear reactions occurring there. He was captivated for life by that idea. Clayton completed his Ph.D. Thesis in 1961 on the growth of the abundances of the heavy elements owing to the slow capture of free neutrons (the s process) by more abundant lighter elements in stars. Clayton and his wife Mary Lou played a small role in producing the celebrated Feynman Lectures on Physics by converting the taped audio of Richard Feynman's lectures to prose. Caltech afforded Clayton the chance to meet and later become a lifelong friend of Fred Hoyle, British cosmologist and creator of the theory of nucleosynthesis in stars. Hoyle exerted strong lifetime influence on Clayton. Clayton's published collaborations with Fowler (1983 Nobel Laureate in Physics) as Fowler's research student (1957–60) and subsequently as Fowler's post-doctoral research associate (1961–63) launched Clayton's scientific career.

He established himself at Caltech as a new worker in the field of nucleosynthesis in stars by calculating the first time-dependent models of both the s process and the fast neutron-capture chains of the r process of heavy-element nucleosynthesis and of the nuclear abundance quasiequilibrium that establishes the highly radioactive abundances between silicon and nickel during silicon burning in stars. He came onto the field early, when nucleosynthesis was a vibrant, modern frontier. Citations are in the Nucleosynthesis section below.

Academic history
A historic connection of Clayton's academic career to NASA's Apollo Program arose through establishment by Rice University of its Department of Space Science in 1963. This action by Rice University provided the academic position assumed by Clayton in 1963. Clayton described this good fortune in his autobiography. His academic research into five fields of astrophysics championed by him is detailed in section 5 below. Foundational academic positions at Caltech, Rice University and Clemson University were augmented by international breadth: seven-year-long academic affiliations in Cambridge (1967–1974) and later in Heidelberg (1976–82), as well as by visiting summer positions in Cardiff UK (1976, 1977) as well as sabbatical leaves in Cambridge (1971), Heidelberg (1981) and Durham University UK (1987).

Following his two-year (1961–63) postdoctoral research fellowship at Caltech, Clayton was awarded an Assistant Professorship, one of the four founding faculty members in Rice University's newly created Department of Space Science (later renamed Space Physics and Astronomy). There he initiated  a graduate-student course explaining nuclear reactions in stars as the mechanism for the creation of the atoms of our chemical elements. His pioneering textbook based on that course (Principles of Stellar Evolution and Nucleosynthesis, McGraw-Hill 1968) earned ongoing praise. In 2018, 50 years after its first publication, it is still in common usage in graduate education throughout the world. At Rice Clayton was awarded the newly endowed Andrew Hays Buchanan Professorship of Astrophysics in 1968 and held that endowed professorship for twenty years until responding to the opportunity to guide a new astrophysics program at Clemson University in 1989. During the 1970s at Rice University Clayton guided Ph.D. theses of many research students who achieved renown, especially Stanford E. Woosley, William Michael Howard, H. C. Goldwire, Richard A. Ward, Michael J. Newman, Eliahu Dwek, Mark Leising and Kurt Liffman. Senior thesis students at Rice University included Bradley S. Meyer and Lucy Ziurys, both of whom forged distinguished careers in the subjects of those senior theses. Historical photos of several students can be seen on Clayton' s photo archive for the history of nuclear astrophysics. Clayton followed the historic Apollo 11 mission while on holiday with his family in Ireland while traveling to Cambridge UK for his third research summer there.

Letters in  winter 1966 from W.A. Fowler unexpectedly invited Clayton to return to Caltech in order to coauthor a book on nucleosynthesis with Fowler and Fred Hoyle. In his autobiography Clayton quotes these letters. He accepted that offer but the book was never written because while he was resident at Caltech Clayton was invited by Fred Hoyle to Cambridge University (UK) in spring 1967 to advise a research program in nucleosynthesis at Hoyle's newly created Institute of Astronomy. The award to Clayton of an Alfred P. Sloan Foundation Fellowship (1966–68) facilitated leaves of absence from Rice University for this purpose. Clayton exerted that research leadership in Cambridge during 1967-72 by bringing his research students from Rice University with him. That prolific period ended abruptly by Hoyle's unexpected resignation from Cambridge University in 1972. Clayton was during these years a Visiting Fellow of Clare Hall. At Rice University W.D. Arnett, S.E. Woosley, and W.M. Howard published jointly numerous innovative studies with Clayton on the topic of explosive supernova nucleosynthesis. During his Cambridge years, Clayton proposed radioactive gamma-ray-emitting nuclei as nucleosynthesis sources for the field of gamma-ray astronomy of line transitions from radioactive nuclei with coauthors  (Stirling Colgate, Gerald J. Fishman, and Joseph Silk). Detection of these gamma-ray lines two decades later provided the decisive proof that iron had been synthesized explosively in supernovae in the form of radioactive nickel isotopes rather than as iron itself, which Fowler and Hoyle had both advocated.

During (1977–84) Clayton resided part-time annually at the Max Planck Institute for Nuclear Physics in Heidelberg as Humboldt Prize awardee, sponsored by Till Kirsten. Annual academic leaves from Rice University facilitated this. There he joined the Meteoritical Society seeking audience for his newly published theoretical picture of a new type of isotopic astronomy based on the relative abundances of the isotopes of the chemical elements within interstellar dust grains. He hoped that such interstellar grains could be discovered within meteorites; and he also advanced a related theory that he called cosmic chemical memory by which the effects of stardust can be measured in meteoritic minerals even if stardust itself no longer exists there. Clayton designated the crystalline component of interstellar dust that had condensed thermally from hot and cooling stellar gases by a new scientific name, stardust. Stardust became an important component of cosmic dust. Clayton has described the stiff resistance encountered from meteoriticist referees of his early papers advancing this new theory. He nonetheless established that research program at Rice University, where he continued guiding graduate-student research on that topic. He and student Kurt Liffman computed a pathbreaking history of survival rates of refractory stardust in the interstellar medium after its ejection from stars; and with student Mark D. Leising computed a propagation model of positron annihilation lines within nova explosions and of the angular distribution of gamma ray lines from radioactive 26Al in the galaxy. Following laboratory discovery in 1987 of meteoritic  stardust bearing unequivocal isotopic markers of stars, Clayton was awarded the 1991 Leonard Medal, the highest honor of the Meteoritical Society. Feeling vindicated,<ref>Clayton's own words in Catch a falling star op cit attest to his sense of vindication over this issue:(1) The telephone rings in s-process stardust, p 400-401; (2)"Comic battle over the Leonard Medal, p. 489–491</ref> Clayton exulted in Nature "the human race holds solid samples of supernovae in its hands and studies them in terrestrial laboratories".

In 1989 Clayton accepted a professorship at Clemson University to develop a graduate research program in astrophysics there. He began this academic segment (1989–present) by hiring three talented young astrophysicists  to vitalize joint research with the Compton Gamma Ray Observatory (launched in 1991 after several delays). Its four  instruments successfully detected gamma-ray lines identifying several of the radioactive nuclei that Clayton had predicted to be present in supernova remnants. Clayton had been designated ten years earlier Co-Investigator on the NASA proposal submitted by James Kurfess for the Oriented Scintillation Spectrometer Experiment OSSE, one of the four successful instruments carried into orbit by Space Shuttle Atlantis, and he carried that research contract to Clemson. Simultaneously Clayton developed at Clemson his stardust research, introducing annual workshops for its researchers. The initial NASA-sponsored workshop at Clemson in 1990 was so lively that it was repeated the following year jointly with Washington University in St. Louis cosponsorship, and in later years cosponsored also by the University of Chicago and by the Carnegie Institution of Washington. These workshops featured the excitement of new isotopic discoveries, and also helped participants focus their ideas for submission of abstracts to NASA's Lunar and Planetary Science Conference. Otherwise participants' workshop discussions were not shared or publicized.

Eventually a unique new goal became to assemble from his large personal collection of photographs a web-based archive for the history of nuclear astrophysics and to donate the original photographs to the Center for the History of Physics, a wing of the American Institute of Physics. The thrusts of Clayton's career at Clemson University are well represented on that Photo Archive by photos between 1990 and 2014. Following his retirement from academic duties in 2007, Clayton remained quite active in research problems involving condensation of dust within supernovae and has also published a scientific autobiography, Catch a Falling Star. Clayton's published refereed research papers prior to 2011 are listed at http://claytonstarcatcher.com/files/documents/JournalPub.pdf

Personal
Clayton married three times: in 1954 in Dallas to Mary Lou Keesee (deceased 1981, Houston) while they were students at SMU; in 1972 in St. Blasien, Germany to a young German woman, Annette Hildebrand (divorced 1981, Houston); in 1983 in the Rice University Chapel, finally to the former Nancy Eileen McBride who was trained in art and in architecture and is today an artist.

Clayton's promotion to full professor at Rice University was brisk (1963–69). In 1989 he resigned to accept an offer from Clemson University in South Carolina to guide the establishment of a research program in astrophysics. Clemson University had launched an effort to move into the top 20 of public universities, and Clayton's hire was part of that plan. He resides with Nancy in historic G. W. Gignilliat House (1898) in Seneca, South Carolina (pop. 8,000), seven miles from the city of Clemson. They jointly have one son who grew up in that house, Andrew, born in 1987 in Houston. Clayton's three previous children arose from his earlier marriages. A son (Donald Douglas Clayton b.1960, Pasadena CA) lives in Houston and a daughter (Alia Clayton Fisher, b. 1977, Houston) lives with her husband and four children in Longmont, Colorado. Another son, Devon Clayton (b. 1961 Pasadena), died in 1996 in Seneca SC. Clayton has one brother (d. 1980) and two sisters living in Texas, two of whom were also born in Iowa. Clayton's mother and father had both been born on family farms in Fontanelle IA to parents who had lived their entire lives on Fontanelle farms. Their own parents had immigrated to Iowa near 1850 from England and Germany. Two of Clayton's great grandfathers (Kembery and Clayton) fought in the Civil War (North). Robert M. Clayton fought in Sherman's Army at the battle of Atlanta.

While at Rice University Clayton was introduced by patron of the arts Dominique de Menil to Italian filmmaker Roberto Rossellini, and they jointly conceived of a film about one scientist's deepening realizations during a cosmological life, a sequence of experiences which Clayton proposed to provide for that project. In summer 1970 Clayton spent two weeks in Rome working daily with Rosselini  on that effort, which failed owing to insufficient financial support or to insufficiently theatrical plan. Clayton's published early memoir The Dark Night Sky: a personal adventure in cosmology laid out his plan for that film.

Citations of seminal research
Clayton's research innovations in astrophysics and planetary science lay in five disciplines that have been largely introduced above; but the five sections here provide more details and more complete citations to his work for readers wanting more information. Clayton's own history of each topic as described within his autobiography, Catch a Falling Star, is given at the end of each section. The references are to Clayton's noteworthy published papers. Clayton's independent style produced an unusual 120 single-author research papers, a relatively large number for astrophysicists.

Nuclear physics origin of the chemical elements (Nucleosynthesis)
Trained at Caltech as a nuclear physicist by Wm. A. Fowler, Clayton was well positioned to consider interactions of heavy nuclei with neutrons. These were believed by Fowler to govern the nucleosynthesis of nuclei heavier than iron. Clayton established that theory by calculations of the isotopic abundances of heavier elements produced by neutron irradiation of iron in stars for both the slow neutron capture S-process and the rapid neutron capture R-process of heavy-element stellar nucleosynthesis (processes first defined by B2FH). Clayton's two papers in 1961 and 1965 on those topics demonstrated that the solar-system abundances had been created not by a single neutron irradiation but as superpositions of abundance patterns established in presolar stars by differing neutron irradiations. His 1961 calculations of s-process abundance patterns, achieved by mathematical analysis rather than by not-yet-mature digital computation, established Clayton as a nucleosynthesis theorist. They also provided a standard model for the s process abundance patterns. Clayton published subsequent papers on the mathematical properties of that standard model, each bearing the title s-process studies, followed by a specific subtitle. that guided four decades of progress on the s process abundances and on derived characteristics of the r-process abundances. In 1967 Clayton turned to the supernova origin of the abundances of elements that can be created in stars from hydrogen and helium alone. Those so-called primary nucleosynthesis nuclei having atomic weights between silicon and nickel (A=28-62) are very abundant. To understand their dramatic alternating abundances he tested a new conceptual idea that he named nuclear quasiequilibrium during silicon burning The quasiequilibrium concept did explain the observed numbers of isotopes in the A=28-62 mass range, which had previously been unsolved. Nuclear quasiequilibrium was at that time the grandest advance in theory of primary nucleosynthesis in supernovae since Hoyle's 1954 paper, whose focus it validated. Of extreme importance was its demonstration that supernova silicon burning should become profoundly radioactive because rapid quasiequilibrium between atomic weights A=44-62 is overwhelmingly of radioactive nuclei. Clayton's recent description in 2016 in terms of a secondary supernova machine of this important process with B. S. Meyer clarified that the intense radioactivity resulted from supernova shock waves forcing excess Coulomb energy into those nuclei.

Abundant radioactivity is widely regarded as Clayton's most important discovery for astronomy because it controls the late luminosity of supernovae. Quasiequilibrium demanded that even the mountain-like abundance peak at iron was synthesized as radioactive nickel parents 56Ni and 57Ni in the supernovae explosions rather than as iron directly as Hoyle and Fowler maintained. This discovery ignited Clayton's long and productive focus with radioactive isotopes ejected from supernovae, leading to his predictions of both gamma-ray line astronomy and of radioactive supernova grains condensed from hot supernova gases Experimental confirmation two decades later of both predictions spurred those new fields of astronomy and brought Clayton high honors. At Rice University a prolific 1970–74 with colleagues W. David Arnett, Stanford E. Woosley and W.Michael Howard explored other explosive nucleosynthesis caused by the radially outgoing supernova shock wave. Leadership of nucleosynthesis seems to have shifted by 1975 to Rice University.

During 1967-72 Clayton resided half time in Cambridge U.K. at Hoyle's invitation to import and advise nucleosynthesis research at Hoyle's newly constructed Institute of Theoretical Astronomy. Clayton did this by bringing his graduate students at Rice with him to Cambridge. After Hoyle's abrupt 1972 resignation from Cambridge Hoyle made three research visits with Clayton at Rice University. After Clayton's 1989 move to Clemson University, his research with Bradley S. Meyer showed how the uniquely puzzling 48Ca isotope of calcium had become so abundant in the Galaxy owing to a relatively rare form of Type Ia supernovae in which the appropriate neutron-enriched quasiiequilibrium nucleosynthesis occurs. They subsequently explained why the minor 95Mo and 97Mo isotopes of the element molybdenum had become dominant in supernovae stardust explaining an experimental riddle in stardust isotopic abundances.

Clayton began in 2000 a spirited prose description of isotopic nucleosynthesis in order to increase its accessibility both to laymen and to scientists conducting isotopic analyses of stardust. Becoming increasingly disappointed at the same time that Hoyle's theory of primary nucleosynthesis in massive stars was being overlooked and forgotten after he fell into science disfavor over his views on interstellar biology, Clayton published two historical papers reestablishing community consciousness of Hoyle's pioneering achievement. Younger scientists who never knew Hoyle were overlooking what his 1954 paper had achieved See chapters 7, 9 and 18 of Clayton's life in Catch a Falling Star.

Gamma-ray-line astronomy of radioactive nuclei in supernovae
Clayton, Colgate and Fishman's 1969 prediction that motivated pursuing gamma-ray-line astronomy  as an empirical test of supernova nucleosynthesis was recognized in the American Astronomical Society Centennial Volume  as one of the 50 most influential astrophysics papers of the 20th century. Observational discovery of those gamma rays would later confirm explosive nucleosynthesis theory and cement mankind's understanding of the profoundly radioactive nature of supernovae.  It is  the innovation for which Clayton is best known. His NASA-funded research at Rice University during the 1970s sought after additional nuclear prospects for that high-energy spectroscopic astronomy, which is based on the recognizable energies of gamma rays emitted by individual radioactive nuclei that had recently been ejected from supernovae. Today it has blossomed with many observational results after quickly becoming a goal for future space astronomy missions, especially at a time when Compton Gamma Ray Observatory was being proposed to NASA in 1977 (launched by Space Shuttle Atlantis in 1991). Hopes were suddenly raised for a detectable source when in 1987 optical astronomers discovered a nearby supernova called SN1987A in the Large Magellanic Cloud. Clayton described those hopes from his 1987 sabbatical-year office at Durham University UK as a mounting excitement generated by observed X-ray emission from its supernova surface. His research with L-S The augmented understanding of those hard X-rays and their derivation from the radioactivity gamma rays permeating supernova interiors. Supernova 1987A gamma-ray-line emission did yield exciting first detections of those gamma-ray lines from 56Co and from 57Co (by OSSE with Clayton a coauthor) thereby establishing this field of astronomy. The Compton Gamma Ray Observatory, the space gamma-ray telescope mission that detected several predicted gamma-ray lines, was the second mission of NASA's Great Observatories program.

In 1977 at Rice University Clayton had been named Co-Investigator for the NASA-approved proposal for the OSSE spectrometer on Compton, and in 1982 he  summarized physical expectations for several gamma-ray-line emitting young nuclei. Key to the intense supernova radioactivity had been Clayton's 1967 discovery that rapid-silicon-burning was dominated by abundances of radioactive alpha-particle nuclei (those having equal numbers of protons and neutronsPrinciples of Stellar Evolution and Nucleosynthesis, Chap. 7 (1968)). Clayton has quipped that SN explosions are "the largest nuclear accidents of all time". Supernova 1987A ejected 20,000 times the mass of the earth as pure radioactive 56Ni nuclei! Abundant iron of our world was demonstrated to be a daughter of radioactive nickel, the most important of the radioactive nuclei. Modern studies of supernovae are dominated by their intensely radioactive natures. Spacetime data for cosmology relies on 56Ni radioactivity providing the energy for the optical brightness of supernovae of Type Ia, which are the "standard candles" of cosmology but whose diagnostic 847keV and 1238keV gamma rays were first detected only in 2014, fully 47 years after Clayton's prediction of their emission by supernovae. Clayton's work earned for him NASA's 1992 Exceptional Scientific Achievement Award and in the same year the NASA Public Service Group Achievement Award for the OSSE Spectrometer on the Compton Gamma Ray Observatory. Both the OSSE instrument and the Comptel instrument confirmed predictions. Clayton had previously attempted to establish gamma-ray-line astronomy from r process radioactive nuclei; but r-process nuclei are much less abundant in supernovae than are the nuclei fused during silicon-burning. So it was the latter that became the demonstrated source of radioactive nuclei.  Chapters 8, 11, 17 and 18 in Catch a Falling Star, whose title Clayton has said he chose as an allusion to the gravitational core collapse that triggers these supernovae.

Astronomy of Stardust
Clayton introduced the idea that the relative abundances of the isotopes in tiny solid dust grains that condensed within hot gas leaving individual stars would be observable in such single dust grains. Those grains reveal the isotopic composition of their parent stars. He named these solids stardust, postulating thereby a new component of interstellar Cosmic dust. Stardust inherits its unusual isotopic compositions from the evolved nuclear composition of the parent star within which that grain condensed. Clayton's initial steps focused on large isotopic excesses in supernova dust grains owing to decays of abundant short-lived radioactive nuclei that were created in the nuclear explosion and then condensed within a few months in the cooling ejecta; but it was generalized to all types of stellar mass loss in 1978. These isotopic abundance ratios were predicted to differ from common solar-system ratios more than any that had ever been observed; but Clayton emphasized their likelihood in stardust. He described stardust as a ubiquitous component within interstellar dust, a peppering of the interstellar medium. These papers initially encountered such incredulity in the field of cosmochemistry that most were rejected first and published only later; nonetheless, Robert Walker and Ernst Zinner at Washington University in St. Louis undertook instrumental development that would prove capable of measuring isotope ratios in such tiny solids. Almost two decades of experimental search were required before intact stardust grains, (also called presolar grains by some meteoriticists), were successfully isolated from the vast remainder of normal presolar dust particles. Tiny stardust grains were successfully extracted from meteorites and their isotopes counted by precision laboratory technique of secondary ion mass spectrometry (SIMS). Those dramatic experimental discoveries in the 1990s, led primarily by Ernst Zinner (d.2015) and his colleagues atWashington University in St. Louis, confirmed the stunning reality of this new type of astronomy; namely, solid interstellar dust particles that condensed within stellar gases long before the earth was created are today studied in laboratories on earth. These tiny stones are quite literally solid pieces of long dead stars. This was a revolutionary idea, endowing that experimental search with excitement. The discovery experiments dispelled skepticism surrounding Clayton's predictions, causing him to be awarded the 1991 Leonard Medal of the Meteoritical Society. Main modern themes of this solid-state astronomical  science have been summarized in 2004 by Clayton & Nittler. To debate the meanings of the frequent new discoveries Clayton initiated in 1990 at Clemson University an annual series of workshops co-sponsored by NASA and planned jointly with Ernst Zinner and his colleagues at Washington University in St. Louis. These workshops have continued annually for 27 years. Clayton continued new interpretations of stardust for three decades after his founding ideas. Noterworthy was his interpretation of the puzzling silicon isotope ratios found in the presolar Asymptotic giant branch stars, which demonstrably were the donor stars of the known presolar mainstream silicon carbide stardust grains that peppered the interstellar solar birth cloud. He interpreted  them as arising from stars born in a galactic merger of Milky Way interstellar gas with the interstellar gas from a smaller captured satellite galaxy possessing a lower gaseous isotopic abundance ratio for 30Si28Si owing to its lesser degree of galactic abundance evolution. That picture audaciously claimed that the merger of a small satellite galaxy with the Milky Way (a galactic-scale event) can be seen within microscopic interstellar grains of sand. Chapters 14 and 15 and pages 504–508 in Catch a Falling StarGalactic abundance evolution of radioactive nuclei
Clayton created mathematical tools for calculating the interstellar abundances of radioactive nuclei in the Galaxy. In 1964 he discovered a new method for measuring the age of interstellar nuclei based on the larger than expected observed abundances of stable daughters of radioactive nuclei. The decays of rhenium-187 to osmium-187 and of uranium and thorium to three differing isotopes of lead (Pb) defined the cosmoradiogenic chronologies. Merging his cosmoradiogenic method with an earlier method based only on the abundances of uranium and thorium themselves still did not yield a consistent galactic age, however. Clayton wrote that the discord arose from inadequate treatments of both the history of star formation in the Galaxy and of the rate of infall of pristine metal-free gas onto the young Milky Way, compounded by a prevailing but erroneous technique for computation of the radioactive abundances within interstellar gas. Reasoning that interstellar gas contains a higher concentrations of shorter-lived radioactive nuclei than do the stars, Clayton invented in 1985 new mathematical solutions for the simplified differential equations of galactic abundance evolution that for the first time rendered these relationships understandable, ending decades of poor reasoning about radioactive abundances. Clayton then calculated an age of 13-15 billion years for the oldest galactic nuclei, which would necessarily approximate the long-sought age of our galaxy. More recently radioactive cosmochronology has diminished in importance because more precise techniques for determining the age of the Milky Way have been discovered in the cosmic microwave background. Nonetheless, his analytic solutions demonstrated importantly that the concentration of short-lived radioactive nuclei in interstellar gas had routinely been underestimated by the factor (k+1), where k is an integer near 2 or 3 that measures the steepness of the rate of decline of the infall of pristine gas onto our growing galactic mass.

For scientific studies of the identities and the initial abundances of short-lived radioactive nuclei that remained alive at differing concentrations within the interstellar gas cloud that formed the solar system, but which are now extinct in the solar system, Clayton's factor (k+1) has grown in importance owing to experimental discoveries of many such nuclei within the meteorites. These are called the extinct radioactivities because none remain on earth today but which did leave clear evidence of their prior existence in meteorites. Solution for a model history for the origin of our solar system that simultaneously fits their residual abundances became the guiding principle for a new discipline that focuses on local extra nucleosynthesis near the solar interstellar cloud during the billion years preceding solar birth. In 1983, at a time when astrophysicists relied for simplicity on a well mixed interstellar gas,  Clayton introduced a new related aspect of the interstellar medium that has proven to be essential for understanding the abundances of the extinct radioactivities; namely the time required for isotopic mixing between freshly synthesized atoms ejected from supernovae with distinct physical phases of interstellar gas. He showed that because those time delays allowed more interstellar decay of radioactive nuclei, each phase of interstellar gas contains a distinctly different concentration of each of the extinct radioactive nuclides, whereas the early solar system radioactivities measure only those abundances present in the dense molecular-cloud phase in which the solar system was born. In the 21st century many researchers have begun to present their own calculations of the effect of interstellar inter-phase mixing, often unaware of Clayton's (1983) paper owing to the intervening decades. Aspects of interstellar-phase mixing are sure to remain important for decades to come while astronomers probe the circumstances of solar birth using accurate meteoritic data revealing the abundances of the extinct radioactive nuclei. Clayton therefore gave emphasis to extinct radioactivity in the Glossary of his 2003 book on isotopes in the cosmos.

Condensation of carbon solids from oxygen-rich supernova gas
In 1998 Clayton voiced a new idea for supernova chemistry by arguing that radioactive decay causes carbon to condense within oxygen-rich supernova gas. He reached that conclusion after Weihong Liu and Alexander Dalgarno showed that radioactive decays of 56Co create fast Compton-scattered electrons that would dissociate the CO molecule [e+CO > e'+C+O], thereby preventing the complete oxidation of carbon atoms within young remnants of core-collapse supernovae. Clayton initiated an energetic crusade in 1998 demonstrating that the vast reservoir of carbon in core-collapse supernovae must condense as carbon dust despite being bathed in more-abundant oxygen gas. This idea met skepticism from meteoriiticists and cosmochemists because it contradicted a commonly accepted rule of thumb that held that the abundance of carbon must exceed that of oxygen (written C>O) in order for carbon to condense. Clayton advocated that supernova carbon stardust (which in 1977 he had named SUNOCONs, an acronym for SUperNOva CONdensates) could therefore assemble within hot supernova C+O gases containing more oxygen than carbon and nothing else. Rather than a specialist's chemical detail, this is a profound conclusion for astrophysics because it partly explains the large amounts of dust created by supernovae in the early universe. Meteoritic chemists to whom his 1998-99 Lunar and Planetary Science Conference papers were addressed  doubted that possibility on intuitive but erroneous chemical grounds, believing that abundant hot oxygen gas would oxidize all carbon atoms leaving them trapped within chemically inert CO molecules—an expectation that holds true in ordinary stars. Clayton asserted that this incorrect chemical rule-of-thumb was erroneously biasing interpretive studies of carbon SUNOCONs (primarily SiC grains and graphite grains). With Lih-Sin The at Clemson he computed the large density of energetic electrons produced by scattering of gamma rays emitted by radioactive cobalt. Those continuously replenish the abundance of free carbon atoms in the supernova gas by breaking apart the abundant CO molecules. In the most recent of his papers, Clayton & Meyer (2017)  computed every reaction step from hot gas to cold grains during the cooling expansion of the supernova gas. Those quite abundant free carbon atoms enable carbon-chain molecules to maintain their small abundances against constant oxidation and later capture carbon atoms until they become macroscopic grains of carbon. He summarized his new picture in a 2011 review paper advancing new rules for carbon condensation in oxygen-rich supernovae gases. The kinetic-chemical-reaction model underlying all of these works was initially devised with Weihong Liu and Alexander Dalgarno and later expanded by Clayton and his colleagues at Clemson. Their works  showed that very large dust grains (micrometers in radius) in comparison with average interstellar-medium dust sizes grow within the expanding oxygen-rich supernova interiors owing to the principle  of Population Control. According to that principle rapid oxidation actually intensifies growth of large grains of carbon by keeping the population of carbon solids small so that those few can grow large by accreting the continuously replenished free carbon. This topic establishes another new aspect of carbon's uniquely versatile chemistry. Their 2017 paper  also computes the abundances of molecules and of Buckminsterfullerene grains ejected along with the graphite grains. Chapter 18 of Catch a Falling Star''

References

1935 births
Living people
21st-century American physicists
Clemson University faculty
Rice University faculty
People from Highland Park, Texas
California Institute of Technology faculty
Academics of the University of Cambridge